This is a 'list of châteaux in Poitou-Charentes, France.

 Charente Ancient province of central Angoumois, Saintonge to the west, Périgord to the south-east, Limousin and Poitou to the north.Château d'Angoulême in Angoulême
Château d'Ars in Ars
Château de Bagnolet in Cognac
Château de Balzac in Balzac
Château de Barbezieux in Barbezieux-Saint-Hilaire
Château de Bayers in Bayers
Château de Beauregard in Juillac-le-Coq
Château de Blanzaguet-Saint-Cybard, Blanzaguet-Saint-Cybard
Château de Bourg-Charente in Bourg-Charente
Logis de Bourgneuf in Cherves-Richemont
Logis de Boussac in Cherves-Richemont
Château de Bouteville in Bouteville
 Château de la Bréchinie in Grassac
Tour du Breuil in Dignac
Château de Brigueuil in Brigueuil
Château de Chalais in Chalais
logis de Chalonne in Fléac
 Château de Chambes in Roumazières-Loubert
Château de Chanteloup in Cherves-Richemont
 Château de Chatenay in Cognac
Château Chesnel in Cherves-Richemont
Château de la Chétardie in Exideuil
Château de Chillac in Chillac
Château de Cognac in Cognac
Château de Confolens in Confolens
Château de Cressé in Bourg-Charente
Château d'Échoisy in Cellettes
Château de la Faye in Deviat
Château de Fleurac in Nersac
 Château de Gademoulins in Gensac-la-Pallue
Château de Garde-Épée in Saint-Brice
Château de Gourville in Gourville
Château de Jarnac in Jarnac
Château de Lignères in Rouillac
Château de Lignières in Lignières-Sonneville
 Motte féodale de Loubert in Roumazières-Loubert
Manoir du Maine-Giraud in Champagne-Vigny
Donjon de Marthon in Marthon
 Château de Montausier in Baignes-Sainte-Radegonde
Château de Montbron, at Montbron
 Château de Montchaude in Montchaude
Donjon de Montignac-Charente in Montignac-Charente
Logis de la Mothe in Criteuil-la-Magdeleine
Château de Nieuil in Nieuil
Château de l'Oisellerie in La Couronne
Château de Peyras in Roumazières-Loubert
Château de Puybautier in Saint-Coutant
Château de Richemont in Cherves-Richemont
Château de Rochebrune in Étagnac
Château de La Rochefoucauld in La Rochefoucauld
Château de Roissac in Angeac-Champagne
Château de Saint-Brice in Saint-Brice
Logis de Saint-Rémy in Cherves-Richemont
Château de Saveille in Paizay-Naudouin-Embourie
Logis Médiéval de Tessé in La Forêt-de-Tessé
Château de la Tranchade in Garat
Château de Triac in Triac-Lautrait
Château de Verteuil in Verteuil-sur-Charente
Château de Villebois-Lavalette in Villebois-Lavalette
Château de Villevert in Esse

 Charente-Maritime Ancient province of Aunis and Saintonge to the east.Château d'Aulnay in Aulnay-de-Saintonge
Château d'Authon in Authon-Ébéon
Château de Balanzac in Balanzac
Château de Beaufief in Mazeray
Château de Beaulon in Saint-Dizant-du-Gua
Château de Bois-Charmant, at Nouillers
Fort Boyard, municipality of Île-d'Aix
Tour de Broue in Saint-Sornin
Château de Buzay in La Jarne
Château de Crazannes in Crazannes
Château de Dampierre-sur-Boutonne in Dampierre-sur-Boutonne
Château du Douhet in Douhet
Château d'Écoyeux or Château de Polignac, in Écoyeux
Château de la Faye in Villexavier
Donjon de Fouras in Fouras
Château de la Gataudière in Marennes
Tour de l'Isleau, le donjon de Saint-Sulpice-d'Arnoult
Château de Jonzac in Jonzac
Château de Lussac in Lussac
Château de Matha in Matha
Château de Meux in Meux
Château de Mons in Royan
Château de Montendre in Montendre
Château de Montguyon in Montguyon
Château de la Morinerie in Écurat
Château de Mornay in Saint-Pierre-de-l'Isle
Château de Neuvicq-le-Château in Neuvicq-le-Château
Château de Nieul-lès-Saintes in Nieul-lès-Saintes
Château de Panloy in Port-d'Envaux
Château de Pisany in Pisany
Château de Plassac in Plassac
Donjon de Pons in Pons
Château de Ransanne in Soulignonne
Château de Rioux in Rioux
Château de la Rochecourbon in Saint-Porchaire
Château de Romefort in Saint-Georges-des-Coteaux
Château de Saint-Jean-d'Angle in Saint-Jean-d'Angle
Château de Saint-Maury in Pons, birthplace of Théodore Agrippa d'Aubigné, French Protestant, Baroque writer and poet.
Tour de Saint-Sauvant in Saint-Sauvant
Hospice de Soubise or Hôtel des Rohan, à Soubise
Château de Taillebourg in Taillebourg
 Château de Tesson in Tesson
Château d'Usson or Château des Énigmes in Pons
Château de Villeneuve-la-Comtesse in Villeneuve-la-Comtesse

 Deux-Sèvres Ancient province of PoitouChâteau d'Airvault in Airvault
Château du Bois de Sanzay in Saint-Martin-de-Sanzay
Château de Bourdin in Saint-Pardoux
Château de Bressuire in Bressuire
Château de La Chapelle-Bertrand in La Chapelle-Bertrand
Château de Cherveux in Cherveux
Château Coudray-Salbart in Échiré (fortified castle)
Château de Coulonges-sur-l'Autize in Coulonges-sur-l'Autize
Château du Deffend in Montravers
Château des Ducs de La Trémoille, in Thouars
Château de la Durbelière, in Mauléon (the old town of Saint-Aubin-de-Baubigné)
Château de la Foye in Couture-d'Argenson
Château de la Guyonnière in Beaulieu-sous-Parthenay
Château de l'Herbaudière in Saivres
Château de Saugè in Saivres www.chateaudesauge.com
Château de Javarzay in Chef-Boutonne
 Château de Jouhé in Pioussay
Château de Maisontiers in Maisontiers
Château de Mursay in Échiré
Donjon de Niort in Niort
Château de Nuchèze in Champdeniers-Saint-Denis
Château d'Oiron in Oiron
Château d'Olbreuse in Usseau
Château d'Orfeuille in Gourgé
Château des Ousches in Saint-Génard
Château de Parthenay in Parthenay
Château de Payré in La Peyratte
Château de Piogé in Availles-Thouarsais
Château de la Roche Faton in Lhoumois
Château de Saint-Loup-sur-Thouet in Saint-Loup-Lamairé
Château de Saint-Mesmin in Saint-André-sur-Sèvre
Château de Saint-Symphorien in Saint-Symphorien
Château de Sanzay in Argenton-les-Vallées
Château de la Sayette in Vasles
Château du Chilleau in Vasles
Château de la Rochetaillée in Échiré
Château de Tennessus in Amailloux
Château du Vieux Deffend in Montravers
Château de la Villedieu de Comblé in La Mothe-Saint-Héray

 Vienne Ancient province of Poitou''

Château d'Angles-sur-l'Anglin in Angles-sur-l'Anglin
Château de Berrie in Berrie
Château du Bois-Doucet in Lavoux
Château de la Bonnetière in La Chaussée
Château de Bonnivet in Vendeuvre-du-Poitou
Château de Chambonneau in Gizay
Château de la Chapelle Bellouin in La Roche-Rigault
Château de Château-Larcher including the Tour Metgon, in Château-Larcher
Complexe castral de Chauvigny in Chauvigny
Château de la Chèze in Latillé
Château de Chiré-en-Montreuil in Chiré-en-Montreuil
 Château de Chitré in Vouneuil-sur-Vienne
Château du Cibioux in Surin
Château de Clairvaux in Scorbé-Clairvaux
Tour du Cordier in Poitiers
 Château-Couvert in Jaunay-Clan
Château de Cujalais in Ceaux-en-Couhé
Château de Dissay in Dissay
Château d'Épanvilliers in Brux
Château du Fou in Vouneuil-sur-Vienne
Château de Galmoisin in Saint-Maurice-la-Clouère
Château de Gençay in Gençay
Château de Gilles de Rais in Cheneché
Château du Haut-Clairvaux in Scorbé-Clairvaux
Château de la Jarige in Pressac
Château de La Lande in Montmorillon
Château de Léray in Saint-Pierre-d'Exideuil
Château de Loudun in Loudun
Château de Lusignan in Lusignan
Château de Masseuil in Quinçay
Château de la Merveillère in Thuré
Château de la Messelière in Queaux
Donjon de Moncontour in Moncontour
Château de Monts-sur-Guesnes in Monts-sur-Guesnes
Château de Morthemer in Valdivienne
Château de la Mothe-Chandeniers, at Trois-Moutiers
Château de la Motte in Usseau
Château des Ormes, at Ormes
Château de Puygarreau in Saint-Genest-d'Ambière
Château de la Réauté in Ligugé
Château des Robinières in Scorbé-Clairvaux
Château de la Roche-Gençay in Magné
Donjon de Saint-Cassien in Angliers
Château de Targé in Châtellerault
Château de Ternay in Ternay
Manoir de la Thibaudière in Tercé
Château de Touffou in Bonnes
Château de Vaucour in Leignes-sur-Fontaine
Château de Vayres in Saint-Georges-lès-Baillargeaux
Château de la Vervolière in Coussay-les-Bois
Tour de Viliers Boivin in Vézières
Château d'Yversay in Yversay

Notes and references

See also
 List of castles in France

 Poitou-Charentes
Poitou-Charentes